The Finnmark Fotballkrets (Finnmark Football Association) is one of the 18 district organisations of the Norwegian Football Federation. It administers lower tier football in the traditional district of Finnmark.

Background 
Finnmark Fotballkrets, is the governing body for football in the traditional district of Finnmark, which today is a part of the county Troms og Finnmark. The Association currently has 38 member clubs. Based in Alta, the Association's chairman is Torkjell Johnsen.

Affiliated Members 
The following clubs are affiliated to the Finnmark Fotballkrets:

Alta IF
AVJU
Båtsfjord SK
Berlevåg FK
Billefjord IL
Bjørnevatn IL
Bølgen IL
Bossekop UL
Havøysund IL
Hesseng IL
HIF/Stein
Honningsvåg T&IF
IL Frea
Indrefjord IL
Kaiskuru IL
Kautokeino IL
Kirkenes IF
Kvalsund IL
Masi IL
Nerskogen IL
Neverfjord IL
Norild IL
Nordkinn FK
Nordlys IL
Øksfjord IL
IL Pasvik Hauk
IL Polarstjernen
Porsanger IL
Rafsbotn IL
Sandnes IL
Sirma IL
Sørild BK
FK Sørøy Glimt
Talvik IL
Tana BK
Tverrelvdalen IL
Varanger BK
Vardø IL

League competitions 
Finnmark Fotballkrets run the following league competitions:

Men's football
4. divisjon  -  one section
5. divisjon  -  three sections

Women's football
2. divisjon  -  one section (with Troms Fotballkrets)

Footnotes

Finnmark
Sport in Finnmark